J. Keith van Straaten (born June 16, 1971) is an American actor, host, and writer.  He was born in Chicago, Illinois.

On TV, he hosted the first season of the Comedy Central game show Beat the Geeks in 2001 and began appearing as a panelist on VH1's Best Week Ever in 2006.  He frequently appears as a commentator on E! Entertainment Television on shows such as: 25 Most Memorable Swimsuit Moments and Wildest Spring Break Moments.

Van Straaten has worked with Yahoo! on a number of projects. During the 2007 and 2008 Academy Award season, he authored a blog on Yahoo! Movies covering events and information up to and including the awards show. He also wrote their 2007 Summer and Holiday Movie Guides.  The 28 short Yahoo! Answers  On The Street segments 

were also hosted by van Straaten.

He briefly hosted a weekend internet radio show in 2007, the Game Show Radio Game Show.

Van Straaten has appeared in several television commercials, including those for McDonald's, Nike, and Cheez-It.  He hosted the pilot for the US edition of Balls of Steel.

He produced and hosted a live-on-stage revival of What's My Line? at the Barrow Street Theatre in New York City, following its run at ACME Comedy Theatre in Los Angeles, California.  He also created puzzles and served as head writer on NPR's quiz show "Ask Me Another". Also, he produced and hosted "The Fix-Up Show," a live-on-stage matchmaking show at the Triad Theater in New York City.

Currently he hosts the Maximum Fun podcast "Go Fact Yourself" alongside comedian Helen Hong.

References

External links
Official website and blog
"The Fix-Up Show" official website
What's My Line? - Live On Stage official website 
Yahoo! Movies Oscar blog

1971 births
Living people
Latin School of Chicago alumni
American male television actors
American game show hosts
American people of Dutch descent
Male actors from Chicago
Yahoo! people